Strictly Come Dancing returned for its fifteenth series in 2017 with a launch show on 9 September on BBC One, and live shows starting on 23 September. Tess Daly and Claudia Winkleman returned as hosts, while Zoe Ball returned to host Strictly Come Dancing: It Takes Two on BBC Two.

Bruno Tonioli, Craig Revel Horwood, and Darcey Bussell returned as judges. On 9 May 2017, it was announced that Len Goodman, who had retired from the show at the end of the previous series, would be replaced by Shirley Ballas. Tonioli missed the week 5 episode due to a scheduling conflict, and was not replaced by a guest judge. Therefore, the maximum score for a pair that week was 30.

In a change to the format of previous series, there was no elimination in the final, hence there were three runner-up couples. The series was won by Holby City actor Joe McFadden and his professional partner Katya Jones. McFadden was the first Scottish celebrity to win the show and, at the time, was the oldest winner at 42, though that record was subsequently broken by Bill Bailey, the winner of series 18. Another Strictly record was broken when Alexandra Burke scored the most "10s" in the history of the show, her 32 surpassing the record set by Series 7 runner-up Ricky Whittle. The series saw the final appearance of professional dancer Brendan Cole.

Professional dancers
On 21 June 2017, the list of professionals returning for the fifteenth series was revealed. Professionals from the last series who did not return include last year's winner Joanne Clifton, former professional finalist Natalie Lowe and Oksana Platero. Amy Dowden, former Dancing with the Stars Australia professional dancer Dianne Buswell and Nadiya Bychkova replaced them. For the second year in a row, Neil Jones and Chloe Hewitt were not partnered with a celebrity.

Couples
On 7 August 2017, the first celebrity announced to be participating in the series was The Saturdays singer Mollie King. Celebrity reveals continued across the month with the line up being completed on The One Show on 21 August 2017.

Scoring chart

Average chart
For Week 5, where Bruno Tonioli was absent and there were only three judges, the scores have been weighted to work on the same scale. Extra points given from the Paso Doble-thon in Week 10 have been omitted from the total.

Highest and lowest scoring performances of the series
The highest and lowest performances in each dance are as follows. Scores from Week 5, when there were only three judges, have been adjusted to show a score out of 40.

Jonnie Peacock and Mollie King are the only celebrities not to land on this list.

Couples' highest and lowest scoring dances
The highest and lowest performances in each couple are listed. Scores from Week 5, when there were only three judges, have been adjusted to show a score out of 40.

Weekly scores and songs
Unless indicated otherwise, individual judges scores in the charts below (given in parentheses) are listed in this order from left to right: Craig Revel Horwood, Darcey Bussell, Shirley Ballas, Bruno Tonioli.

Launch show

Musical guests: Shania Twain – "Life's About to Get Good" and Rita Ora – "Lonely Together"
During the show, professional dancers performed a tribute to former presenter Sir Bruce Forsyth, who died just weeks before the show began.

Week 1

Running order

Week 2
Musical guest: Emeli Sandé—"Starlight"
 Running order 

Judges' votes to save

Horwood: Chizzy & Pasha
Bussell: Brian & Amy
Tonioli: Brian & Amy
Ballas: Brian & Amy

Week 3: Movie Week
Musical guest: Sheridan Smith—"My Man"
 Running order 

Judges' votes to save

Horwood: Simon & Karen
Bussell: Simon & Karen
Tonioli: Simon & Karen
Ballas: Did not vote, but would have voted to save Simon & Karen

Week 4
 Musical guest: Gregory Porter—"Smile"
 Running order 

Judges' votes to save

Horwood: Davood & Nadiya
Bussell: Davood & Nadiya
Tonioli: Davood & Nadiya
Ballas: Did not vote, but would have voted to save Davood & Nadiya

Week 5

Individual judges scores given in the chart below (given in parentheses) are listed in this order from left to right: Craig Revel Horwood, Darcey Bussell, Shirley Ballas.

Musical guest: The Script—"Arms Open"
 Running order 

Judges' votes to save
Horwood: Simon & Karen
Bussell: Simon & Karen
Ballas: Did not vote, but would have voted to save Simon & Karen

Week 6: Halloween Week
Musical guest: Steps—"Scared of the Dark"
 Running order 

Judges' votes to save

Horwood: Mollie & AJ
Bussell: Mollie & AJ
Tonioli: Mollie & AJ
Ballas: Did not vote, but would have voted to save Mollie & AJ

Week 7
Musical guest: Stereophonics—"Caught by the Wind"
 Running order 

Judges' votes to save

Horwood: Mollie & AJ
Bussell: Aston & Janette
Tonioli: Aston & Janette
Ballas: Mollie & AJ

Week 8
Musical guest: Seal—"Autumn Leaves"
 Running order 

Judges' votes to save

Horwood: Jonnie & Oti
Bussell: Jonnie & Oti
Tonioli: Jonnie & Oti
Ballas: Did not vote, but would have voted to save Jonnie & Oti

Week 9: Blackpool Week
Musical guest: Tears for Fears—"Everybody Wants to Rule the World" and Alfie Boe & Michael Ball—"New York, New York"
 Running order 

Judges' votes to save

Horwood: Debbie & Giovanni
Bussell: Debbie & Giovanni
Tonioli: Debbie & Giovanni
Ballas: Did not vote, but would have voted to save Debbie & Giovanni

Week 10
Musical guest: Kelly Clarkson—"Meaning of Life"
 Running order 

Judges' votes to save

Horwood: Alexandra & Gorka
Bussell: Alexandra & Gorka
Tonioli: Alexandra & Gorka
Ballas: Did not vote, but would have voted to save Alexandra & Gorka

Week 11: Musicals Week (Quarter-final)
Musical guests: Leading Ladies (Amber Riley, Beverley Knight, and Cassidy Janson)—"I'm Every Woman"
 Running order 

Judges' votes to save

Horwood: Alexandra & Gorka
Bussell: Alexandra & Gorka
Tonioli: Alexandra & Gorka
Ballas: Did not vote, but would have voted to save Alexandra & Gorka

Week 12: Semi-Final
Musical guest: Craig David and Bastille— "I Know You"
Running order

For the Dance Off, Mollie & AJ chose to dance their Waltz, while Gemma & Aljaž chose to dance their Tango.
Judges' votes to save

Horwood: Gemma & Aljaž
Bussell: Gemma & Aljaž
Tonioli: Gemma & Aljaž
Ballas: Did not vote, but would have voted to save Gemma & Aljaž

Week 13: Final
Musical guest: Ed Sheeran—"Perfect"
Running order

Dance chart

 Highest scoring dance
 Lowest scoring dance

Week 1: Cha-Cha-Cha, Foxtrot, Jive, Paso Doble, Tango, Viennese Waltz or Waltz
Week 2: One unlearned dance (introducing American Smooth, Charleston, Quickstep and Salsa)
Week 3 (Movie Week): One unlearned dance (introducing Rumba and Samba)
Weeks 4 & 5: One unlearned dance
Week 6 (Halloween Week): One unlearned dance
Week 7: One unlearned dance
Week 8: One unlearned dance (introducing Argentine Tango)
Week 9 (Blackpool Week): One unlearned dance
Week 10: One unlearned dance and Paso Doble-thon
Week 11 (Musicals Week): One unlearned dance
Week 12 (Semi-final): Two unlearned dances
Week 13 (Final): Judges' choice, showdance and couple's favourite dance

Ratings

Weekly ratings for each show on BBC One. All ratings are provided by BARB. The series 15 first live show with 11.04 million viewers is the most watched series debut for the show in its history.

References

External links

2017 British television seasons
Series 15